The 2021 GEICO 500 was a NASCAR Cup Series race was held on April 25, 2021, at Talladega Superspeedway in Lincoln, Alabama. Contested over 191 laps – extended from 188 laps due to an overtime finish, on the 2.66 mile (4.28 km) superspeedway, it was the 10th race of the 2021 NASCAR Cup Series season, as well as the second of the four crown jewel races. Brad Keselowski won the race, his 35th career victory, sixth win at Talladega (which tied Jeff Gordon for the second-most victories at the track), and his last win with Team Penske in the No. 2 as he moved to Roush Fenway Keselowski Racing in 2022.

Report

Background

Talladega Superspeedway, formerly known as Alabama International Motor Speedway, is a motorsports complex located north of Talladega, Alabama. It is located on the former Anniston Air Force Base in the small city of Lincoln. A tri-oval, the track was constructed in 1969 by the International Speedway Corporation, a business controlled by the France family. Talladega is most known for its steep banking. The track currently hosts NASCAR's Cup Series, Xfinity Series and Camping World Truck Series. Talladega is the longest NASCAR oval with a length of 2.66-mile-long (4.28 km) tri-oval like the Daytona International Speedway, which is 2.5-mile-long (4.0 km).

Entry list
 (R) denotes rookie driver.
 (i) denotes driver who are ineligible for series driver points.

Qualifying
Denny Hamlin was awarded the pole for the race as determined by competition-based formula.

Starting Lineup

Race

Denny Hamlin was awarded the pole. Kyle Larson suffered a blown engine and fell out of the race on only the third lap. On the final lap of the first stage, Joey Logano spun and went airborne, flipping onto its roof. The car's spoiler scraped the roof of Bubba Wallace before rolling back onto all fours at the bottom of turn 3. Matt DiBenedetto was awarded the stage win. On the final lap of the second stage, Hamlin got turned into the wall and collected Chase Elliott, Alex Bowman, and Martin Truex Jr. while Wallace was awarded the stage win, the first of his career. Ricky Stenhouse Jr. would be spun off the bumper of Quin Houff and nose into the wall coming to pit road during green flag pit stops. Truex would suffer a flat tire, bringing out a caution and sending the race to overtime. Brad Keselowski would drive past DiBenedetto and hold off William Byron as several drivers crashed on the final lap to score his sixth career win at Talladega, tying Dale Earnhardt Jr. and Jeff Gordon for second on the all-time Talladega win list behind Dale Earnhardt.

Stage Results

Stage One
Laps: 60

Stage Two
Laps: 60

Final Stage Results

Stage Three
Laps: 68

Race statistics
 Lead changes: 35 among 17 different drivers
 Cautions/Laps: 7 for 34
 Red flags: 0
 Time of race: 3 hours, 26 minutes and 30 seconds
 Average speed:

Media

Television
Fox Sports covered their 21st race at the Talladega Superspeedway. Mike Joy, six-time Talladega winner – and all-time restrictor plate race wins record holder – Jeff Gordon and two-time Talladega winner Clint Bowyer called the race from the broadcast booth. Jamie Little and Regan Smith handled pit road for the television side. Larry McReynolds provided insight from the Fox Sports studio in Charlotte.

Radio
MRN had the radio call for the race which was also simulcast on Sirius XM NASCAR Radio. Alex Hayden and Jeff Striegle called the race in the booth when the field raced through the tri-oval. Dave Moody called the race from the Sunoco spotters stand outside turn 2 when the field raced through turns 1 and 2. Mike Bagley called the race from a platform inside the backstretch when the field raced down the backstretch. Kurt Becker called the race from the Sunoco spotters stand outside turn 4 when the field races through turns 3 and 4. Steve Post, Dillon Welch and Kim Coon worked pit road for the radio side.

Standings after the race

Drivers' Championship standings

Manufacturers' Championship standings

Note: Only the first 16 positions are included for the driver standings.
. – Driver has clinched a position in the NASCAR Cup Series playoffs.

References

GEICO 500
GEICO 500
GEICO 500
NASCAR races at Talladega Superspeedway